Miss You More may refer to:

"Miss You More", song by BBMak from "Back Here" 1999
"Miss You More", single from De/Vision discography 2002
"Miss You More", song by Katy Perry from Witness